Alúvium Blhu is a nature reserve in the Slovak county of Rimavská Sobota in the municipality of Hrušovo. It covers an area of 2,79 ha and has a protection level of 4 under the slovak law. It is part of the Cerová vrchovina Protected Landscape Area

Description
Alúvium Blhu was created for the protection of alder stands. The area is important for scientific research.

Flora
One of the protected plants in the area is the ostrich fern that occurs here in dense concentrations. This fern is a protected and very endangered species in Slovakia

References

Geography of Banská Bystrica Region
Protected areas of Slovakia